Contostavlos is a surname of Greek origin

Byron Contostavlos (died 2007), British rocker bass player

 Costadinos Contostavlos, aka "Dappy"  (born 1987), British singer-songwriter of Greek extraction
 Tula Contostavlos, Tula Paulinea Contostavlos, aka "Tulisa" (born 1988), British singer-songwriter of Greek and Irish extraction

References